The 2016–17 Illinois State Redbirds women's basketball team represents Illinois State University during the 2016–17 NCAA Division I women's basketball season. The Redbirds, led by fourth year head coach Barb Smith, play their home games at Redbird Arena and were members of the Missouri Valley Conference. They finished the season 8–23, 5–13 in MVC play to finish in ninth place. They advanced to the quarterfinals of the Missouri Valley women's tournament where they lost to Northern Iowa.

On March 13, the school fired Barb Smith. She finish at Illinois State with 4 year record of 28–93.

Roster

Schedule

|-
!colspan=9 style="background:#FF0000; color:#000000;"| Exhibition

|-
!colspan=9 style="background:#FF0000; color:#000000;"| Non-conference regular season

|-
!colspan=9 style="background:#FF0000; color:#000000;"| Missouri Valley regular season

|-
!colspan=9 style="background:#FF0000; color:#000000;"| Missouri Valley Women's Tournament

See also
2016–17 Illinois State Redbirds men's basketball team

References

Illinois State Redbirds women's basketball seasons
Illinois State